Desi Nama ( also: "Jama Nama") or Vahi Padhati is the traditional accounting system developed and used in the Indian subcontinent.
Early forms of this system were reportedly used in India before the double entry book keeping system was developed in Europe (13th century).

History

Early mentions/colonial times 
Various books have been written on desi namu from the late 1800s to the 1900s in regional languages.

Adoption of western calendar 
In earlier times desi namu was recorded according Vikram Samvat calendar but now it is recorded according to the financial year.

Accounting technique

Debiting and crediting 
The sides are reversed images of those used in double entry system. The left-hand side is known as ‘Jama' (Credit) and theright-hand side is known as 'Udhar' (Debit).

The first fold (sals) on each side is used for recording the amount and the remaining three are meant for recording the details of the transaction.

The posting from Rojmel or BethoMel is on the same side of the Ledger. e.g. A has paid Rupees 500. This will be recorded on the Jama side of Rojmel. In the Khatavahi (Ledger) also, this would be recorded on the Jama side of A's Account.

In the Khatavahi under Desi Nama only the amount, the Rojmel Pan (folio) number and the tithi (date) are written. No details about the transactions are given.

Account categories 
Accounts are generally divided into three categories: Personal, real and nominal.

Personal accounts

Real accounts

Nominal accounts

Types of account books 
Traditional Indian bookkeeping knows many different types of accounts. The following is non-exhaustive list of some important or notable types.
The word Shri is used as an honorific before many account names, e.g. Shri Bhada Khatun (Rent Account).

Main ledger

Journal / Original entry  
 This book resembles the western style journal but as far as the balance is concerned, it is a Cash Book of the Double Entry System.

Capital account 
 In case of partnerships, a capital account of each partner is opened and the amount contributed by a partner is credited to his Capital Account.

Branch office account 
 When the owner of a business or his salesman, munim, or any other employee travels out of station (deshavar), a lump sum is given to him for expenses. This amount is not debited to his personal account, but is debited to Desawar Account.

Disbursements 
 Small traders debit small expenses of the business to this type of accounts, e.g. postage, stationery, tea and drinks, Muhurt expenses etc. However, in large businesses separate accounts are maintained for such expenses.

Drawings account 
 Any amount spent for personal expenses of the proprietor is debited to this.

Anonymous payments 
 or  When an amount is received or paid to someone whose name is not to be disclosed, then the amount is debited or credited to "Shah Khate". Similarly when an amount is paid to or received from someone and their name is forgotten, the same in debited or credited to Shree Khate and when the name is remembered, the name of the person is inserted in the blank space.

Timekeeping 
Desi Namu system uses months and year of Vikram Samvat which comprises the twelve-month period from Kartik to Aso. Even in this system, the dates according to English calendar are written. (According to Income Tax Law in India, all accounts must be closed annually on 31 March. Hence traders keeping books under Desi Nama also keep their accounting year from 1 April to 31 March now.)

Comparison to western systems 
Leaves (pages) can be added or removed as required. This is appropriate for small traders. They can get the benefit of double entry system by making minor changes. Alas, this means that anybody can tamper with them. Hence the bound books with page numbers used in double entry must be used in desi nama also.

There is no system of columnar book-keeping. Where various items are dealt in, it is convenient to have columnar books. e.g. if a person deals in hosiery and cutlery, it will be convenient to have two columns in Jama Nondh for recording separate purchases of these two items.

Vouchers for all transactions are not systematically filed and maintained nor entered into the main ledger (Khatavahi). This makes a detailed audit trail impossible.

It fails to satisfy the requirements of modern times. Particularly, it is not useful for decision-making in modern big business units.

Contemporary use

India 
western India [Gujarat, Rajasthan etc.]

Materials

Books 
Books are usually covered with red cloth and are hard-bound. Traditionally the transaction lines are entered parallel to the binding. The books in Desi Nama are usually long, double folded and tied with a thick string. The papers are blank, i.e. not ruled. However, in modern times, books of accounts with lined pages are also in use.
Most of the traders keep the first page for worshiping their Gods e.g. Shri Ganeshay Namah or Mahalaxmi Matani Maher Hajo.

Page folding 
Each leaf is folded into eight folds. The first four folds are used for jama and the last four folds (Sals) are used for Udhar. Sometimes a leaf is folded into six folds, three on each side meant for Jama and Udhar respectively. Generally, in case of subsidiary books, six folds are kept.

Ink 
It was the practice to write accounts in black ink only, but now blue ink has become common.

References

External links  

Accounting systems
History of accounting
Accounting in India